Peter Jay Hotez (born May 5, 1958) is an American scientist, pediatrician, and advocate in the fields of global health, vaccinology, and neglected tropical disease control. He serves as founding dean of the National School of Tropical Medicine, Professor of Pediatrics and Molecular Virology & Microbiology at Baylor College of Medicine, where he is also Director of the Texas Children's Hospital Center for Vaccine Development and Texas Children's Hospital Endowed Chair in Tropical Pediatrics, and University Professor of Biology at Baylor College of Medicine. Hotez served previously as president of the American Society of Tropical Medicine and Hygiene and is a founding Editor-in-Chief of PLOS Neglected Tropical Diseases. He is also the co-director of Parasites Without Borders, a global nonprofit organization with a focus on those suffering from parasitic diseases in subtropical environments.

Early life and education
Hotez was born in Hartford, Connecticut, to a Jewish family. His father Edward J. Hotez was a World War II veteran in the United States Navy. Growing up in West Hartford, Hotez graduated from Hall High School in West Hartford. He received a BA in molecular biophysics and biochemistry magna cum laude (Phi Beta Kappa) from Yale University in 1980, a PhD from Rockefeller University in 1986, and a Doctorate in Medicine from Weill Cornell Medical College in 1987. His doctoral dissertation and postdoctoral training were in the areas of hookworm molecular pathogenesis and vaccine development.

Research and career

Early research 
Hotez was awarded postdoctoral positions in molecular parasitology and pediatric infectious diseases at Yale University School of Medicine, where he subsequently became an assistant professor in 1992 and an associate professor in 1995.  His early research focused on the pathogenesis and molecular mechanisms of human hookworm infection that eventually lead to his patented vaccine now in clinical trials, as well as a vaccine against schistosomiasis, also in clinical trials, either of which could be the first successful vaccine for humans to protect against a multi-cellular parasite.

Neglected tropical diseases

From 2000 to 2011, Hotez served as Professor and Chair of the Department of Microbiology and Tropical Medicine (renamed in 2005 as the Department of Microbiology, Immunology, and Tropical Medicine) at the George Washington University.

Following the World Health Organization's (WHO) Millennium Development Goals in 2000, Hotez, along with Drs. Alan Fenwick and David Molyneux, led a global effort to rename diseases then being termed simply "other diseases,"  as "neglected tropical diseases" (NTDs), and promoting the use of therapeutic/preventive chemotherapy through a combination of drugs called the "rapid-impact package." Hotez has advocated for increased efforts to control NTDs since 2005 through publications and speaking engagements, helping to gain increased awareness resulting in a decrease of prevalence and disease burden in many areas.

During these years, Hotez also led the Sabin Vaccine Institute in Washington, D.C., as well as efforts to establish PLOS Neglected Tropical Diseases, the first online open access medical journal focused exclusively on neglected tropical diseases.

Vaccine development
In addition to continuing work on vaccines already in clinical trials for hookworm and schistosomiasis, Hotez currently leads a team of researchers developing vaccines against other diseases including leishmaniasis, Chagas disease, SARS, and MERS, and is also working in development of a Coronavirus vaccine. With Maria Elena Bottazzi, he led the team that designed COVID-19 vaccine Corbevax.

COVID-19 response

Hotez has actively used his public profile on Twitter and other social media platforms to help combat misinformation about the COVID-19 pandemic. He has also appeared as an invited expert in a number of cable news and radio shows. In an interview with the American Medical Association, Hotez noted that communicating clear messages about the ongoing pandemic is of vital importance in an environment that is rife with confusing and misleading messages. "We've been hearing either the sky was falling or there was no problem... the reality is more nuanced than that and that requires some explanation based on scientific principles." Hotez has also warned that contrary to popular belief, more young adults than expected would be hospitalized due to the outbreak of COVID-19: "The message is that we've been trying to appeal to younger adults and have them shelter away and do the social distancing and explaining why they're at risk for transmitting the virus to vulnerable populations." Hotez has also warned against optimistic COVID-19 vaccine timelines, arguing that rushing through the conservative timeline could cause problems, "potentially mak[ing] individuals worse and threaten[ing] vaccine development in the U.S." On August 7, 2020, he said in a television interview that the US can expect to be affected by COVID-19 for "years and years" even after Americans are vaccinated. In that interview, he also blamed the federal government for not taking action to contain the spread of the virus.

Awards and memberships
Selected awards and memberships include:

2018 – Elected member, American Academy of Arts and Sciences
2017 – Carlos Slim Foundation Health Award
2017 – The Distinguished Achievement Award from B'nai B'rith International for a lifetime of accomplishments in science and public health.
2003 – The Bailey K. Ashford Medal from the American Society of Tropical Medicine and Hygiene for distinguished work in tropical medicine.
1999 – Henry Baldwin Ward Medal from the American Society of Parasitologists for outstanding contributions to the field of parasitology.

In 2008, he was elected to membership in the Institute of Medicine of the National Academies. He is an ambassador of the Paul G. Rogers Society for Global Health Research, a Fellow of the American Academy of Pediatrics (FAAP), a member of the World Health Organization Scientific and Technical Advisory Committee for WHO TDR (Special Programme on Tropical Diseases Research), and in 2011, Hotez was appointed as a member of the National Institutes of Health (NIH) Council of Councils. He is a member of the inaugural class of Fellows of the American Society of Tropical Medicine and Hygiene.

Publications and media

Scientific output
Hotez is the author of more than 500 scientific and technical papers on NTDs.

He is a co-editor of Krugman's Infectious Diseases of Children, 11th Edition, and co-editor of Manson's Tropical Diseases, 23rd Edition and Feigin and Cherry's Textbook of Pediatric Infectious Diseases, 7th Edition. 

He is the co-author of the reference work called Parasitic Diseases, 5th Edition.

Outreach
Hotez writes frequently for lay audiences, including papers in Scientific American and op-ed pieces for the New York Times.

He is the author of Blue Marble Health: An Innovative Plan to Fight Diseases of the Poor amid Wealth and Forgotten People, Forgotten Diseases: The Neglected Tropical Diseases and Their Impact on Global Health and Development. 

In 2021 Hotez published a new book titled Preventing the Next Pandemic – Vaccine Diplomacy in a Time of Anti-science.

References

External links

 Parasitic Diseases, 7th Edition
 Parasites Without Borders
 Official website
 PLoS Neglected Tropical Diseases
 

1958 births
Living people
George Washington University faculty
Rockefeller University alumni
Yale University alumni
Harvard Medical School people
Vaccinologists
Weill Cornell Medical College alumni
People from West Hartford, Connecticut
Jewish American scientists
People from Houston
People from Hartford, Connecticut
Hall High School (Connecticut) alumni
Presidents of the American Society of Tropical Medicine and Hygiene
Members of the National Academy of Medicine
Baylor College of Medicine faculty